This is a list of electoral districts or "ridings" in Canada for the Canadian federal election of 1896 and 1900.

Electoral Districts are constituencies that elect Members of Parliament in Canada's House of Commons every election.

Nova Scotia – 20 seats
Annapolis
Antigonish
Cape Breton*
Colchester
Cumberland
Digby
Guysborough
Halifax*
Hants
Inverness
Kings
Lunenburg
Pictou*
Richmond
Shelburne and Queen's
Victoria
Yarmouth

Prince Edward Island – 5 seats
East Prince
East Queen's
King's
West Prince
West Queen's

New Brunswick – 14 seats
Albert
Carleton
Charlotte
City and County of St. John
City of St. John
Gloucester
Kent
King's
Northumberland
Restigouche
Sunbury—Queen's
Victoria
Westmorland
York

Quebec – 65 seats
Argenteuil
Bagot
Beauce
Beauharnois
Bellechasse
Berthier
Bonaventure
Brome
Chambly—Verchères (Chambly prior to 1893)
Champlain
Charlevoix
Châteauguay
Chicoutimi—Saguenay
Compton
Dorchester
Drummond—Arthabaska
Gaspé
Hochelaga
Huntingdon
Jacques Cartier
Joliette
Kamouraska
L'Assomption 
L'Islet
Labelle
Laprairie—Napierville
Laval
Lévis
Lotbinière
Maisonneuve
Maskinongé
Mégantic
Missisquoi
Montcalm
Montmagny
Montmorency
Nicolet
Pontiac
Portneuf
Quebec County
Quebec East
Quebec West
Quebec-Centre
Richelieu
Richmond—Wolfe
Rimouski
Rouville
Shefford
Town of Sherbrooke
Soulanges
St. Anne
St. Antoine
St. Hyacinthe
St. James
St. Johns—Iberville
St. Lawrence
St. Mary
Stanstead
Témiscouata
Terrebonne
Three Rivers and St. Maurice
Two Mountains
Vaudreuil
Wright
Yamaska

Ontario – 92 seats
Addington
Algoma
Bothwell
Brant South
Brockville
Bruce East
Bruce North
Bruce West
Cardwell
Carleton
Cornwall and Stormont
Dundas
Durham East
Durham West
Elgin East
Elgin West
Essex North
Essex South
Frontenac
Glengarry
Grenville South
Grey East
Grey North
Grey South
Haldimand and Monck
Halton
Hamilton*
Hastings East
Hastings North
Hastings West
Huron East
Huron South
Huron West
Kent
Kingston
Lambton East
Lambton West
Lanark North
Lanark South
Leeds North and Grenville North
Leeds South
Lennox
Lincoln and Niagara
London
Middlesex East
Middlesex North
Middlesex South
Middlesex West
Muskoka and Parry Sound
Nipissing
Norfolk North
Norfolk South
Northumberland East
Northumberland West
Ontario North
Ontario South
Ontario West
Ottawa (City of)*
Oxford North
Oxford South
Peel
Perth North
Perth South
Peterborough East
Peterborough West
Prescott
Prince Edward
Renfrew North
Renfrew South
Russell
Simcoe East
Simcoe North
Simcoe South
Toronto Centre
Toronto East
Victoria North
Victoria South
Waterloo North
Waterloo South
Welland
Wellington Centre
Wellington North
Wellington South
Wentworth North and Brant
Wentworth South
West Toronto*
York East
York North
York West

Manitoba – 7 seats
Brandon
Lisgar
Macdonald
Marquette
Provencher
Selkirk
Winnipeg

British Columbia – 6 seats
Burrard
New Westminster
Vancouver
Victoria*
Yale—Cariboo

Northwest Territories – 4 seats
Alberta (Provisional District)
Assiniboia East
Assiniboia West
Saskatchewan (Provisional District)

Yukon – 1 seat
Yukon (created in 1902)
*returned two members

External links
Map of ridings

1892-1903
1890s in Canada
1900s in Canada